Cabrito Rock is a Spanish rock festival, usually lasting about two days. Inspired by the Cosquin Rock festival, it takes place in Recreo, Argentina, and is the only festival of its kind in the Catamarca Province.

History
The festival was first held on January 6, 2007 at "Club Union Sportiva" with an audience of over 1,000 people. The second festival was held in 2008 at "Club Atlético Pedro Cano", opening to a larger crowd than the first year.

In 2009, its third year, the crowd outgrew the organizers' expectations, with over 2,200 people in attendance. This time, images were broadcast on a giant screens located on the side of the stage. The fourth festival was held on February 6, 2010, with a night of tributes to great bands.

Performers
January 6, 2007: Morfosis, La Maza, Papaya, Refuerzo, Adaggio, Radales
February 9, 2008: La Mula Vieja, Morfosis, La Maza, Aura
February 7, 2009: Juan Antonio Ferreyra "JAF", bands of Córdoba
February 6, 2010: Far West, Sujetos, Brote Meztizo, Lady Magnun, Deltabu, R.P. y Refuerzo
February 12, 2011: Emmanuel Horvilleur, Ciro Fogliata, Redo and local bands

References

Music festivals established in 2007
Rock festivals in Argentina
Argentine music
2007 establishments in Argentina
Tourist attractions in Catamarca Province
Summer events in Argentina